Žarkovac is a small settlement (hamlet) in Serbia. It is situated in the Sombor municipality, West Bačka District, Vojvodina province.

Geography

Officially, Žarkovac is not classified as a separate settlement, but as suburban part of the town of Sombor. It is located between Stapar and Lugumerci.

See also
Sombor
List of places in Serbia
List of cities, towns and villages in Vojvodina

References
Vojvodina - auto karta, Magic Map, Smederevska Palanka, 2001.

Places in Bačka
Sombor
West Bačka District